TerraGlyph Interactive Studios was a multi-platform game development studio located in Schaumburg, IL and was founded in 1994.  The company was the game development division of the TerraGlyph group of companies, which also includes a feature animation studio in Dublin Ireland, a web/media services division and a business visualization company both located near Chicago, IL.

Terraglyph's main product line consisted of beautifully rendered CDROM-based children's games.  Originally, their concept was to create several edutainment games based on classic fairy tales such as Hansel and Gretel that were both fun to play as well as developed in 5 different languages for kids to learn new languages as they played.  Later, their game development included popular licensed titles such as Kidsongs and TinyToons.

Games Published
Win95/Mac/MS-DOS
 Hansel & Gretel and the Enchanted Castle
 Rumpelstiltskin's Labyrinth of the Lost
 Tiny Toon Adventures: Buster and the Beanstalk
 Kidsongs Musical Mystery
 Beowulf (99% finished)
 Scooby-Doo! Showdown in Ghost Town

PlayStation

 Tiny Toon Adventures: Toonenstein
 Tiny Toon Adventures: The Great Beanstalk
 Blue's Big Musical

Nintendo 64
 Scooby-Doo! Classic Creep Capers
 Carnivalé: Cenzo's Adventure (Cancelled)

Animated Films (TerraGlyph Productions Dublin) 
 Help! I'm a Fish (2000)
 Carnivalé (2000)
 Duck Ugly (2000)
 Wilde Stories (2003) (Oscar Wilde short stories for Channel 4)

References

Video game development companies
Video game companies established in 1994
Video game companies disestablished in 1997
Defunct video game companies of the United States
1994 establishments in Illinois